Maria Diana's Chapel is located in the Gandara Public Cemetery, Gandara, Samar, Philippines and is the home of the corpse of Maria Diana Alvarez believed by the populace to be miraculous.

References 

Chapels in the Philippines
Buildings and structures in Samar (province)